Seaford Secondary College (previously known as Seaford 6-12 School until 2014) is a coeducational public secondary school located in Seaford in the City of Onkaparinga in Adelaide, South Australia. As of 2021, the school consists of 112 staff members, with the role of Principal held by Harry Stassinopoulos.

Library
Seaford Secondary College includes a joint-use library, which is co-operated by City of Onkaparinga Libraries and the Department for Education, and is available to both the school and the local community. The library has been nationally and internationally recognised as a leading example of joint-use libraries.

Sporting houses
Seaford Secondary College includes the following four sporting houses with their respective colours:

Co-curricular activities

Sports

Surfing
 Come 'N' Try Surf Day
 School Sport South Australia (SSSA) Surfing Competition

Other sports

 AFL
 Athletics
 Basketball
 Netball

 Rugby
 Soccer
 Touch Football

References

External links

 

Public schools in South Australia
Secondary schools in Adelaide
Educational institutions established in 1996
2006 establishments in Australia